Dana L. Belben (born May 12, 1978) is an American voice actress, animator, screenwriter, effects artist, and comedian.

Career
Belben worked as story editor on Happy Tree Friends, as well as providing the original voices for Giggles, Petunia, and Cub.

She also provided the script for Surf's Up and provided the voice of Edna Maverick in the movie. Belben also provided additional voices in the Open Season series. She was the visual effects coordinator on clothing and hair for Cloudy with a Chance of Meatballs. She also voiced Peaches in Ice Age: Dawn of the Dinosaurs in an uncredited role.

She is currently working at Disney Feature Animation.

She graduated from San Luis Obispo High School in 1995.

References

External links
 

American voice actresses
American animators
American screenwriters
American film actresses
American television actresses
Living people
American women comedians
Place of birth missing (living people)
American women animators
1986 births
21st-century American women